The following are the national records in athletics in Honduras maintained by its national athletics federation: Federación Nacional Hondureña de Atletismo (FENHATLE).

Outdoor

Key to tables:

h = hand timing

Men

Women

Indoor

Men

Women

Notelist

References
General
World Athletics Statistic Handbook 2022: National Outdoor Records
World Athletics Statistic Handbook 2022: National Indoor Records
Specific

External links

Honduras
Records
Athletics
Athletics